Winter Landscape with Ice-skaters and Bird-trap is a 1565 painting attributed to the Flemish painter Pieter Bruegel the Elder, located in the Royal Museums of Fine Arts of Belgium in Brussels. It shows a village scene where people skate on a frozen river, while on the right among trees and bushes, birds gather around a bird trap. It has become known as the original or oldest exemplar of the most successful painting of the Brueghel family dynasty, since the art historian Klaus Ertz documented 127 copies in his comprehensive monograph on the artist's son in 2000.

Of the 127 documented copies in 2000, Ertz lists 45 as by Pieter Brueghel the Younger, 51 doubtful, and 31 rejected-but-notable, and all of these were created in the 17th century. Since 2000 the discussion has not stopped and possibly this painting employs motifs from some earlier lost original by Jan Brueghel the Elder, along the lines of The Hunters in the Snow. Each known copy seems to emphasize subtle details, whether it is in the game of curling, the arrangement of the bird trap, the hole in the ice, or various moralistic and religious themes. Two copies documented by Ertz depict the Rest on the Flight into Egypt. The variation of motifs and their popularity in the copies has led to much speculation and comparison of contemporary engravings and the later popularity of the winter landscape as its own art genre, which enabled painters such as Hendrick Avercamp to build a business around painting them.

Gallery

References

Paintings in Brussels
1565 paintings
Landscape paintings